The Order of Naval Merit is a Brazilian military decoration established on 4 July 1934 by president Getúlio Vargas.

Design

On the obverse side of the medal is the effigy of the republic, surrounded by a circle of blue enamel, on which is written the words "Naval Merit". On the reverse side, the word "Brasil" is inscribed in the same blue circle. The medal is composed with a red grosgrain ribbon, or chamalotada, with a light blue stripe in the center.

Grades
The five grades are Grand Cross, Grand Officer, Commander, Officer, and Chevalier.

References

Orders, decorations, and medals of Brazil

Awards established in 1934
1934 establishments in Brazil